The second season of the Reborn! anime series is a compilation of episodes 34 to 65 from the series. The second season aired in Japan from June 2, 2007 to January 12, 2008 on TV Tokyo. Titled as Katekyō Hitman Reborn! in Japan, the Japanese television series was directed by Kenichi Imaizumi, and produced and animated by Artland. The plot, based on the Reborn! manga by Akira Amano, follows the life of Tsunayoshi "Tsuna" Sawada, the candidate to be the Mafia boss of the Vongola Famiglia, who must fight against a group of assassins called the Varia who wants to get their leader Xanxus to become the Vongola boss. In order to help Tsuna, some of his friends become guardians for the Vongola to fight the Varia. 

Six pieces of theme music are used for the episodes: two opening themes and four ending themes. The first opening theme is LM.C's "Boys and Girls", while in episode 52 it is changed to Cherryblossom's "Dive to World". The first ending theme is Splay's "Echo Again" until episode thirty-eight, then Idoling's "Friend" until episode fifty-one. Two of the anime's voice actors, Takashi Kondō and Toshinobu Iida, provided their voices for the fifth ending theme, "Sakura Addiction", which is used for episodes fifty-two to sixty-two. That is followed by Lead's "STAND UP!" for the remainder of the season.

Marvelous Entertainment released the season onto eight DVD compilations separated into "Battle" volumes, with each containing a total of four episodes. The Battle volumes were released from November 30, 2007 to June 27, 2008, and contained episodes 34 to 65. On March 21, 2009, Japan's d-rights production company collaborated with the anime-streaming website called Crunchyroll in order to begin streaming subbed episodes of the Japanese-dubbed series worldwide. New episodes are available to everyone a week after its airing in Japan.


Season 2: 2007–2008

References 
General
 
 
 
Specific

External links 
Official Reborn! website 
TV Tokyo's official anime website 

2007 Japanese television seasons
2008 Japanese television seasons
Season 2